Selling counterfeit illegal drugs is a crime in many U.S. states' legal codes and in the federal law of the United States. The fake drugs are sometimes termed as imitation controlled substances.

Relation to drug-related crimes

There is a low chance of law punishing fraud among illicit drug traders, however it is likely that informal social control among drug traders reduces the likelihood of fraud between illegal trade partners. For instance, getting robbed or losing a business contact may not justify dealer's increased profits for a short-term from fraudulent behavior.

Legal status

Selling counterfeit illicit drugs is illegal even if the substances used to make the imitation drug are not illegal on themselves. It is illegal to distribute or sell counterfeit fake drugs in many U.S. states including Nevada, Ohio, Illinois, Florida, Michigan and Massachusetts.

U.S. Federal Law

Selling counterfeit illicit drugs is illegal under the U.S. federal law. Relevant parts of the U.S. federal law include 21 U.S.C. Section 331 and 18 U.S. Code § 1001.

21 U.S.C. Section 331 makes it illegal to sell an adulterated or misbranded drug in interstate commerce.

18 U.S. Code § 1001 bans

falsifying, concealing or covering up a material fact;
making any materially false, fictitious or fraudulent statement or representation; or
making or using any false writing or document knowing that it contains materially false, fictitious or fraudulent statements.

See also
Unclean hands

References

Crime
Drug control law
Drug policy
History of drug control
Illegal drug trade